Ralph W. Cotton is an American author working in the western genre. He was born near Caneyville, Kentucky.

References

External links
Author's personal home page
Penguin Books Author Page
Bibliography at Fantasticfiction.co.uk

20th-century American novelists
American Western (genre) novelists
Living people
21st-century American novelists
American Lutherans
American male novelists
American crime fiction writers
20th-century American male writers
21st-century American male writers
Year of birth missing (living people)